The following are the Pulitzer Prizes for 1994.

Journalism awards 
Public Service:
Akron Beacon Journal, for its broad examination of local racial attitudes and its subsequent effort to promote improved communication in the community.
Spot News Reporting:
Staff of The New York Times, for its comprehensive coverage of the bombing of Manhattan's World Trade Center.
Investigative Reporting:
Staff of The Providence Journal-Bulletin, for thorough reporting that disclosed pervasive corruption within the Rhode Island court system.
Explanatory Journalism:
Ronald Kotulak of the Chicago Tribune, for his lucid coverage of current developments in neurological science.
Beat Reporting:
Eric Freedman and Jim Mitzelfeld of The Detroit News, for dogged reporting that disclosed flagrant spending abuses at Michigan's House Fiscal Agency.
National Reporting:
Eileen Welsome of The Albuquerque Tribune, for stories that related the experiences of Americans who had been used unknowingly in government radiation experiments nearly 50 years ago.
International Reporting:
Dallas Morning News Team of The Dallas Morning News, for its series examining the epidemic of violence against women in many nations.
Feature Writing:
Isabel Wilkerson of The New York Times, for her profile of a fourth-grader from Chicago's South Side and for two stories reporting on the Midwestern flood of 1993.
Commentary:
William Raspberry of The Washington Post, for his compelling commentaries on a variety of social and political topics.
Criticism:
Lloyd Schwartz of the Boston Phoenix, a weekly, for his skillful and resonant classical music criticism.
Editorial Writing:
R. Bruce Dold of the Chicago Tribune, for his series of editorials deploring the murder of a 3-year-old boy by his abusive mother and decrying the Illinois child welfare system.
Editorial Cartooning:
Michael P. Ramirez of The Commercial Appeal, Memphis, Tennessee, for his trenchant cartoons on contemporary issues.
Spot News Photography:
Paul Watson of the Toronto Star, for his photograph, published in many American newspapers, of a U.S. soldier's body being dragged through the streets of Mogadishu by a mob of jeering Somalis.
Feature Photography:
Kevin Carter, a freelance photographer, for a picture first published in The New York Times of a starving Sudanese girl who collapsed on her way to a feeding center while a vulture waited nearby.

Letters awards 
Fiction:
The Shipping News by E. Annie Proulx (Charles Scribner's Sons)
History:
no award
Biography or Autobiography:
W.E.B. Du Bois: Biography of a Race 1868-1919 by David Levering Lewis (Henry Holt)
Poetry:
Neon Vernacular: New and Selected Poems by Yusef Komunyakaa (Wesleyan University Press)
General Non-Fiction:
Lenin's Tomb: The Last Days of the Soviet Empire by David Remnick (Random House)

Arts awards 
Drama:
Three Tall Women by Edward Albee (Dutton)
Music:
Of Reminiscences and Reflections by Gunther Schuller (Associated Music Publishers)
Premiered on December 2, 1993, in Louisville, Kentucky. Performed and commissioned by The Louisville Orchestra.

References

External links
 

Pulitzer Prizes by year
Pulitzer Prize
Pulitzer Prize